Omiodes camphorae is a moth in the family Crambidae. It was described by Tams in 1928. It is found in Malaysia.

References

Moths described in 1928
camphorae